Tinowaye Leung Yau Wai (born 13 January 2002) is a Hong Kong professional footballer who currently play as a centre back for Japan Football League club Reilac Shiga.

Club career
Leung started his football career in the academies of Yuen Long, Kitchee and Eastern. He made 11 appearances for South China in the 2017–18 Hong Kong First Division League, scoring once. In September 2018, he moved to Portugal and joined Loures.

In January 2020, Leung signed a professional contract with Portuguese side Cova da Piedade. He was promoted to the Cova da Piedade under-23 squad the following February, featuring in a number of games as a substitute. 

Having failed to break into the first team of Cova da Piedade, Leung moved to Thailand in August 2022, signing with Thai League 3 club Chiangrai City. He scored his first goal for Chiangrai City in October of the same year, the only goal in a 1–0 win against Maejo United.

On 19 March 2023, Leung moved to Japan and signed with Japan Football League club Reilac Shiga.

International career
Leung has represented Hong Kong at youth international level.

Career statistics

Club
.

References

2002 births
Living people
Hong Kong footballers
Hong Kong youth international footballers
Association football defenders
Hong Kong First Division League players
Leung Yau Wai
Japan Football League players
South China AA players
MIO Biwako Shiga players
Hong Kong expatriate footballers
Expatriate footballers in Portugal
Expatriate footballers in Thailand
Expatriate footballers in Japan